Richfield Township is one of the eleven townships of Lucas County, Ohio, United States. The 2010 census found 1,598 people in the township, 1,361 of whom lived in the unincorporated portions of the township.

Geography
Located in the northwestern corner part of the county, it borders the following townships:
Riga Township, Lenawee County, Michigan - north
Sylvania Township - east
Spencer Township - south
Fulton Township, Fulton County - southwest corner
Amboy Township, Fulton County - west
Ogden Township, Lenawee County, Michigan - northwest corner

The village of Berkey lies in northwestern Richfield Township, and the unincorporated community of Richfield Center is located in the center of the township.

Name and history
Statewide, other Richfield Townships are located in Henry and Summit counties.

Government
The township is governed by a three-member board of trustees, who are elected in November of odd-numbered years to a four-year term beginning on the following January 1. Two are elected in the year after the presidential election and one is elected in the year before it. There is also an elected township fiscal officer, who serves a four-year term beginning on April 1 of the year after the election, which is held in November of the year before the presidential election. Vacancies in the fiscal officership or on the board of trustees are filled by the remaining trustees.

References

External links
Township website
County website

Townships in Lucas County, Ohio
Townships in Ohio